The gem towns are 51 British towns chosen by the Council for British Archaeology in 1964 from a list 324 historic towns and cities that were thought to be "particularly splendid and precious". The compilation of the list was in response to the 1963 Colin Buchanan report, Traffic in Towns and the redevelopment of Worcester town centre which was seen as insensitive and causing the loss of many heritage assets. The inclusion of a town on the list is still cited in tourist publicity and local authority development plans.

Origins and criteria
The list was compiled in response to the 1963 Colin Buchanan report, Traffic in Towns. It was also in the wake of the insensitive redevelopment of Worcester town centre, with the loss of many heritage assets. Gem towns have been described as having predominantly tourism-based economies that contrast with towns also worthy of preservation but which do not qualify as "gems" because they have an industrial past, or present, and so are less picturesque.

Ongoing significance

The status as a gem town has been used to resist development which is seen as diminishing the historic and attractive features of a town, such as the proposal to open a large discount store in medieval Cockermouth, Cumbria, in 2018 with those in favour citing the lower prices and greater choice that it would bring to residents who were forced to pay high prices locally or shop elsewhere, while those against argued that it would diminish the appeal of one of the last remaining intact gem towns.

The status of a town as a "gem" also continues to be mentioned in local government tourist publicity and in development plans, for instance in the plan for Whitehaven in 2013, and Lewes in 2015.

List of gem towns

The following towns and cities were identified as "gems".

 Aberdeen
 Abingdon
 Barnard Castle
 Bath
 Beverley
 Blandford
 Bradford-on-Avon
 Bridgnorth
 Burford
 Cambridge
 Chipping Campden
 Cockermouth
 Colchester
 Conway
 Cromarty
 Culross
 Edinburgh and Leith
 Haddington
 Hadleigh
 Hereford
 Inveraray
 Kelso
 King's Lynn
 Lavenham
 Lewes
 Lincoln
 Ludlow
 Marlborough
 Monmouth
 Newark-on-Trent
 Newcastle upon Tyne
 Norwich
 Oxford
 Pershore
 Richmond
 Rye
 Salisbury
 Sandwich
 Scarborough
 Stamford
 Stirling 
 Tenby
 Tewkesbury
 Thaxted
 Totnes
 Warwick
 Wells
 Whitehaven
 Wisbech
 Wymondham
 York

References

External links
 Gem towns on Google Maps
 https://www.bidwells.co.uk/news/living-in-a-conservation-area-ten-things-you-need-to-know/

Urban planning
Conservation in the United Kingdom
1964 in the United Kingdom